Granite City may refer to:
Granite City, Illinois, United States
Aberdeen, Scotland
Jalore, India
Quincy, Massachusetts 
St. Cloud, Minnesota, United States
Mount Airy, North Carolina, United States
Wausau, Wisconsin, United States
Aughrim, Wicklow, Republic Of Ireland

USS Granite City (1863), a Confederate steamer